Polykarp Kusch (January 26, 1911 – March 20, 1993) was a German-born American physicist. In 1955, the Nobel Committee gave a divided Nobel Prize for Physics, with one half going to Kusch for his accurate determination that the magnetic moment of the electron was greater than its theoretical value, thus leading to reconsideration of—and innovations in—quantum electrodynamics. (The other 1955 physics laureate was Willis Eugene Lamb, who won for his work on the spectrum of hydrogen.)

Early life and education
Kusch was born in Blankenburg, Germany to John Mathias Kusch, a Lutheran missionary, and his wife, Henrietta van der Haas. In 1912, Kusch and his family had emigrated to the United States, where by 1922 he became a naturalized citizen. After graduating from grade school in the Midwest, Kusch attended Case Institute of Technology in Cleveland, Ohio (now known as Case Western Reserve University), where he majored in physics. After graduating from the Case Western Reserve University with bachelor of science degree in 1931, Kusch joined University of Illinois at Urbana–Champaign, from where he received his master's degree in 1933. He continued his education at the same alma mater, studying for his Ph.D. under mentorship from F. Wheeler Loomis and after defending his thesis titled "The Molecular Spectrum of Caesium and Rubidium", graduated from it in 1936. In 1935, prior to moving to the University of Minnesota, Kusch married his girlfriend, Edith Starr Roberts. Together, they had three daughters.

Career
Kusch then moved to New York City, where from 1937 and until his departure for the newly founded University of Texas at Dallas, he spent much of his career as a professor at Columbia University, and served as the university's provost for several years. He worked on molecular beam resonance studies under I. I. Rabi, then discovered the electron anomalous magnetic moment. Many measurements of magnetic moments and hyperfine structure followed. He expanded into chemical physics and continued to publish research on molecular beams. During his tenure at Columbia, he was the doctoral supervisor for Gordon Gould, the inventor of the laser.

Kusch was a fellow of the American Physical Society since 1940 and of the American Academy of Arts and Sciences since 1959. He was elected a member of the National Academy of Sciences in 1956. In 1967, he was elected to the American Philosophical Society.

Kusch's wife Edith died in 1959, and in the following year he married Betty Pezzoni. They had two daughters. Kusch House, a residential dormitory for undergraduate students at Case Western Reserve University in Cleveland, Ohio on the South Campus is named after Kusch. It is located on Carlton Road in Cleveland Heights. The University of Texas at Dallas has a Polykarp Kusch Auditorium with a plaque.

Kusch died on March 20, 1993 aged 82. His widow Betty died in 2003, aged 77.

Publications

See also
List of Case Western Reserve University people

References

External links

 including his Nobel Lecture, December 12, 1955 The Magnetic Moment of the Electron

1911 births
1993 deaths
People from Blankenburg (Harz)
People from the Duchy of Brunswick
German emigrants to the United States
20th-century American  physicists
20th-century German physicists
University of Illinois Urbana-Champaign alumni
Case Western Reserve University alumni
Columbia University faculty
University of Texas at Dallas faculty
Nobel laureates in Physics
American Nobel laureates
Fellows of the American Academy of Arts and Sciences
Fellows of the American Physical Society
Members of the United States National Academy of Sciences
Members of the American Philosophical Society